The Berlin Blockade (24 June 1948 – 12 May 1949) was one of the first major international crises of the Cold War. During the multinational occupation of post–World War II Germany, the Soviet Union blocked the Western Allies' railway, road, and canal access to the sectors of Berlin under Western control. The Soviets offered to drop the blockade if the Western Allies withdrew the newly introduced Deutsche Mark from West Berlin.

The Western Allies organised the Berlin Airlift from 26 June 1948 to 30 September 1949 to carry supplies to the people of West Berlin, a difficult feat given the size of the city and the population. American and British air forces flew over Berlin more than 250,000 times, dropping necessities such as fuel and food, with the original plan being to lift 3,475 tons of supplies daily. By the spring of 1949, that number was often met twofold, with the peak daily delivery totalling 12,941 tons. Among these, candy-dropping aircraft dubbed "raisin bombers" generated much goodwill among German children.

Having initially concluded there was no way the airlift could work, the Soviets found its continued success an increasing embarrassment. On 12 May 1949, the USSR lifted the blockade of West Berlin, due to economic issues in East Berlin, although for a time the Americans and British continued to supply the city by air as they were worried that the Soviets would resume the blockade and were only trying to disrupt western supply lines. The Berlin Airlift officially ended on 30 September 1949 after fifteen months. The US Air Force had delivered 1,783,573 tons (76.4% of total) and the RAF 541,937 tons (23.3% of total), totalling 2,334,374 tons, nearly two-thirds of which was coal, on 278,228 flights to Berlin. In addition Canadian, Australian, New Zealand and South African air crews assisted the RAF during the blockade. The French also supported but only to provide for their military garrison.

British transports, including Handley Page Haltons and Short Sunderlands, flew as well. At the height of the Airlift, one plane reached West Berlin every thirty seconds.

Seventeen American and eight British aircraft crashed during the operation. A total of 101 fatalities were recorded as a result of the operation, including 40 Britons and 31 Americans, mostly due to non-flying accidents.

The Berlin Blockade served to highlight the competing ideological and economic visions for postwar Europe. It played a major role in aligning West Berlin with the United States and Britain as the major protecting powers, and in drawing West Germany into the NATO orbit several years later in 1955.

Postwar division of Germany

From 17 July to 2 August 1945, the victorious Allies reached the Potsdam Agreement on the fate of postwar Europe, calling for the division of defeated Germany, west of the Oder-Neisse line, into four temporary occupation zones each one controlled by one of the four occupying Allied powers: the United States, the United Kingdom, France and the Soviet Union (thus re-affirming principles laid out earlier by the Yalta Conference). These zones were located roughly around the then-current locations of the allied armies. As the seat of the Allied Control Council, Berlin was also divided into four occupation zones, despite the city's location, which was fully located  inside Soviet-controlled eastern Germany. The United States, United Kingdom, and France controlled western portions of the city, while Soviet troops controlled the eastern sector.

Soviet zone and the Allies' rights of access to Berlin

In the eastern zone, the Soviet authorities forcibly unified the Communist Party of Germany and Social Democratic Party (SPD) in the Socialist Unity Party ("SED"), claiming at the time that it would not have a Marxist–Leninist or Soviet orientation. The SED leaders then called for the "establishment of an anti-fascist, democratic regime, a parliamentary democratic republic" while the Soviet Military Administration suppressed all other political activities. Factories, equipment, technicians, managers and skilled personnel were removed to the Soviet Union.

In a June 1945 meeting, Stalin informed German communist leaders that he expected to slowly undermine the British position within their occupation zone, that the United States would withdraw within a year or two and that nothing would then stand in the way of a united Germany under communist control within the Soviet orbit. Stalin and other leaders told visiting Bulgarian and Yugoslavian delegations in early 1946 that Germany must be both Soviet and communist.

A further factor contributing to the Blockade was that there had never been a formal agreement guaranteeing rail and road access to Berlin through the Soviet zone. At the end of the war, western leaders had relied on Soviet goodwill to provide them with access. At that time, the western allies assumed that the Soviets' refusal to grant any cargo access other than one rail line, limited to ten trains per day, was temporary, but the Soviets refused expansion to the various additional routes that were later proposed.

The Soviets also granted only three air corridors for access to Berlin from Hamburg, Bückeburg, and Frankfurt. In 1946 the Soviets stopped delivering agricultural goods from their zone in eastern Germany, and the American commander, Lucius D. Clay, responded by stopping shipments of dismantled industries from western Germany to the Soviet Union. In response, the Soviets started a public relations campaign against American policy and began to obstruct the administrative work of all four zones of occupation.

Until the blockade began in 1948, the Truman Administration had not decided whether American forces should remain in West Berlin after the establishment of a West German government, planned for 1949.

Focus on Berlin and the elections of 1946
Berlin quickly became the focal point of both US and Soviet efforts to re-align Europe to their respective visions. As Soviet Foreign Minister Vyacheslav Molotov noted, "What happens to Berlin, happens to Germany; what happens to Germany, happens to Europe." Berlin had suffered enormous damage; its prewar population of 4.3 million people was reduced to 2.8 million.

After harsh treatment, forced emigration, political repression and the particularly hard winter of 1945–1946, Germans in the Soviet-controlled zone were hostile to Soviet endeavours. Local elections in 1946 resulted in a massive anti-communist protest vote, especially in the Soviet sector of Berlin. Berlin's citizens overwhelmingly elected non-Communist members to its city government.

Political division

Moves towards a West German state
The US had secretly decided that a unified and neutral Germany would inevitably fall under Soviet domination, with Ambassador Walter Bedell Smith telling General Eisenhower that "in spite of our announced position, we really do not want nor intend to accept German unification on any terms that the Russians might agree to, even though they seem to meet most of our requirements." American planners had privately decided during the war that it would need a strong, allied Germany to assist in the rebuilding of the West European economy.

To coordinate the economies of the British and United States occupation zones, these were combined on 1 January 1947 into what was referred to as the Bizone (renamed "the Trizone" when France joined on 1 June 1948). After March 1946 the British zonal advisory board (Zonenbeirat) was established, with representatives of the states, the central offices, political parties, trade unions, and consumer organisations. As indicated by its name, the zonal advisory board had no legislative power, but was merely advisory. The Control Commission for Germany – British Element made all decisions with its legislative power. In reaction to the Soviet and British advances, in October 1945 the Office of Military Government, United States (OMGUS) encouraged the states in the US zone to form a co-ordinating body, the so-called Länderrat (council of states), with the power to legislate for the entire US zone. It created its own central bodies (Ausschüsse or joint interstate committees) headed by a secretariat seated in Stuttgart. While the British and Soviet central administrations were allied institutions, these US zone committees were not OMGUS subdivisions, but instead were autonomous bodies of German self-rule under OMGUS supervision.

Representatives of these three governments, along with the Benelux nations, met twice in London (London 6-Power Conference) in the first half of 1948 to discuss the future of Germany, going ahead despite Soviet threats to ignore any resulting decisions. Eventually the London Agreement on German External Debts, also known as the London Debt Agreement, was concluded. Under the London Debts Agreement of 1953, the repayable amount was reduced by 50% to about 15 billion marks and stretched out over 30 years, and compared to the fast-growing German economy were of minor impact.

In response to the announcement of the first of these meetings, in late January 1948, the Soviets began stopping British and American trains to Berlin to check passenger identities. As outlined in an announcement on 7 March 1948, all of the governments present approved the extension of the Marshall Plan to Germany, finalised the economic merger of the western occupation zones in Germany and agreed upon the establishment of a federal system of government for them.

After a 9 March meeting between Stalin and his military advisers, a secret memorandum was sent to Molotov on 12 March 1948, outlining a plan to force the policy of the western allies into line with the wishes of the Soviet government by "regulating" access to Berlin. The Allied Control Council (ACC) met for the last time on 20 March 1948, when Vasily Sokolovsky demanded to know the outcome of the London Conference and, on being told by negotiators that they had not yet heard the final results from their governments, he said, "I see no sense in continuing this meeting, and I declare it adjourned."

The entire Soviet delegation rose and walked out. Truman later noted, "For most of Germany, this act merely formalised what had been an obvious fact for some time, namely, that the four-power control machinery had become unworkable. For the city of Berlin, however, this was an indication for a major crisis."

April Crisis and the Little Air Lift
On 25 March 1948, the Soviets issued orders restricting Western military and passenger traffic between the American, British and French occupation zones and Berlin. These new measures began on 1 April along with an announcement that no cargo could leave Berlin by rail without the permission of the Soviet commander. Each train and truck was to be searched by the Soviet authorities. On 2 April, General Clay ordered a halt to all military trains and required that supplies to the military garrison be transported by air, in what was dubbed the "Little Lift."

The Soviets eased their restrictions on Allied military trains on 10 April 1948, but continued periodically to interrupt rail and road traffic during the next 75 days, while the United States continued supplying its military forces by using cargo aircraft. Some 20 flights a day continued through June, building up stocks of food against future Soviet actions, so that by the time the blockade began at the end of June, at least 18 days' supply per major food type, and in some types, much more, had been stockpiled that provided time to build up the ensuing airlift.

At the same time, Soviet military aircraft began to violate West Berlin airspace and would harass, or what the military called "buzz", flights in and out of West Berlin. On 5 April, a Soviet Air Force Yakovlev Yak-3 fighter collided with a British European Airways Vickers Viking 1B airliner near RAF Gatow airfield, killing all aboard both aircraft. Later dubbed the Gatow air disaster, this event exacerbated tensions between the Soviets and the other allied powers.

Internal Soviet reports in April stated that "Our control and restrictive measures have dealt a strong blow to the prestige of the Americans and British in Germany" and that the Americans have "admitted" that the idea of an airlift would be too expensive.

On 9 April, Soviet officials demanded that American military personnel maintaining communication equipment in the Eastern zone must withdraw, thus preventing the use of navigation beacons to mark air routes. On 20 April, the Soviets demanded that all barges obtain clearance before entering the Soviet zone.

Currency crisis

Creation of an economically stable western Germany required reform of the unstable Reichsmark German currency introduced after the 1920s German inflation. The Soviets continued the debasing of the Reichsmark, which had undergone severe inflation during the war, by excessive printing, resulting in many Germans using cigarettes as a de facto currency or for bartering. The Soviets opposed western plans for a reform. They interpreted the new currency as an unjustified, unilateral decision, and responded by cutting all land links between West Berlin and West Germany. The Soviets believed that the only currency that should be allowed to circulate was the currency that they issued themselves.

Anticipating the introduction of a new currency by the other countries in the non-Soviet zones, the Soviet Union in May 1948 directed its military to introduce its own new currency and to permit only the Soviet currency to be used in their sector of Berlin if the other countries brought in a different currency there. On 18 June the United States, Britain and France announced that on 21 June the Deutsche Mark would be introduced, but the Soviets refused to permit its use as legal tender in Berlin. The Allies had already transported 250,000,000 Deutsche marks into the city and it quickly became the standard currency in all four sectors.  Stalin looked to force the Western nations to abandon Berlin.

Start of the Berlin Airlift

Beginning of the blockade

The day after the 18 June 1948 announcement of the new Deutsche Mark, Soviet guards halted all passenger trains and traffic on the autobahn to Berlin, delayed Western and German freight shipments and required that all water transport secure special Soviet permission. On 21 June, the day the Deutsche Mark was introduced, the Soviet military halted a United States military supply train to Berlin and sent it back to western Germany. On 22 June, the Soviets announced that they would introduce the East German mark in their zone.

That same day, a Soviet representative told the other three occupying powers that "We are warning both you and the population of Berlin that we shall apply economic and administrative sanctions that will lead to the circulation in Berlin exclusively of the currency of the Soviet occupation zone." The Soviets launched a massive propaganda campaign condemning Britain, the United States and France by radio, newspaper and loudspeaker. The Soviets conducted well-advertised military maneuvers just outside the city. Rumors of a potential occupation by Soviet troops spread quickly. German communists demonstrated, rioted and attacked pro-West German leaders attending meetings for the municipal government in the Soviet sector.

On 24 June, the Soviets severed land and water connections between the non-Soviet zones and Berlin. That same day, they halted all rail and barge traffic in and out of Berlin. The West answered by introducing a counter-blockade, stopping all rail traffic into East Germany from the British and US zones. Over the following months, this counter-blockade would have a damaging impact on East Germany, as the drying up of coal and steel shipments seriously hindered industrial development in the Soviet zone. On 25 June, the Soviets stopped supplying food to the civilian population in the non-Soviet sectors of Berlin. Motor traffic from Berlin to the western zones was permitted, but this required a  detour to a ferry crossing because of alleged "repairs" to a bridge. They also cut off the electricity relied on by Berlin, using their control over the generating plants in the Soviet zone.

Surface traffic from non-Soviet zones to Berlin was blockaded, leaving open only the air corridors. The Soviets rejected arguments that the occupation rights in the non-Soviet sectors of Berlin and the use of the supply routes during the previous three years had given Britain, France and the United States a legal claim to use of the highways, tunnels, railroads, and canals. Relying on Soviet goodwill after the war, Britain, France, and the United States had never negotiated an agreement with the Soviets to guarantee these land-based rights of access to Berlin through the Soviet zone.

At the time, West Berlin had an estimated 36 days worth of food, and 45 days worth of coal. Militarily, the Americans and British were greatly outnumbered because of the postwar scaling back of their armies. The United States, like other western countries, had disbanded most of its troops and was largely inferior in the European theatre. The entire United States Army had been reduced to 552,000 men by February 1948. Military forces in the western sectors of Berlin numbered only 8,973 Americans, 7,606 British and 6,100 French. Of the 98,000 American troops in West Germany in March 1948, only 31,000 were combat forces, and only one reserve division was immediately available in the United States. Soviet military forces in the Soviet sector that surrounded Berlin totaled 1.5 million. The two United States regiments in Berlin could have provided little resistance against a Soviet attack. Because of the imbalance, US war plans were based on using hundreds of atomic bombs, but only about 50 Fat Man-specification bombs, the only version available to the US military, existed in mid-1948. In March 1948, only 35 "Silverplate" atomic-capable Boeing B-29 Superfortress bombers—just over half of the 65 Silverplate specification B-29 aircraft built through the end of 1947—and a few trained flight and assembly crews were available. Three B-29 groups arrived in Europe in July and August 1948. Despite the intention to signal the threat of the West's ability to retaliate with nuclear weapons if necessary, the Soviets possibly knew that none of the bombers were atomic-capable. The first Silverplate bombers only arrived in Europe near the end of the crisis in April 1949.

General Lucius D. Clay, in charge of the US Occupation Zone in Germany, summed up the reasons for not retreating in a cable to Washington, D.C. on 13 June 1948: 

Believing that Britain, France, and the United States had little option other than to acquiesce, the Soviet Military Administration in Germany celebrated the beginning of the blockade. General Clay felt that the Soviets were bluffing about Berlin since they would not want to be viewed as starting a Third World War. He believed that Stalin did not want a war and that Soviet actions were aimed at exerting military and political pressure on the West to obtain concessions, relying on the West's prudence and unwillingness to provoke a war. Commander of United States Air Forces in Europe (USAFE) General Curtis LeMay reportedly favoured an aggressive response to the blockade, in which his B-29s with fighter escort would approach Soviet air bases while ground troops attempted to reach Berlin; Washington vetoed the plan.

Decision for an airlift
Although the ground routes had never been negotiated, the same was not true of the air. On 30 November 1945, it had been agreed in writing that there would be three twenty-mile-wide air corridors providing free access to Berlin. Additionally, unlike a force of tanks and trucks, the Soviets could not claim that cargo aircraft were a military threat.

The airlift option critically depended on scale and effectiveness. If the supplies could not be flown in fast enough, Soviet help would eventually be needed to prevent starvation. Clay was told to take advice from General LeMay to see if an airlift was possible. Initially taken aback by the inquiry, which was "Can you haul coal?", LeMay replied, "We can haul anything."

When American forces consulted Britain's Royal Air Force about a possible joint airlift, they learned the RAF was already running an airlift in support of British troops in Berlin. General Clay's counterpart, General Sir Brian Robertson, was ready with some concrete numbers. During the Little Lift in April 1948, British Air Commodore Reginald Waite had calculated the resources required to support the entire city.

The American military government, based on a minimum daily ration of 1,990 kilocalories (July 1948), set a total of daily supplies needed at 646 tons of flour and wheat, 125 tons of cereal, 64 tons of fat, 109 tons of meat and fish, 180 tons of dehydrated potatoes, 180 tons of sugar, 11 tons of coffee, 19 tons of powdered milk, 5 tons of whole milk for children, 3 tons of fresh yeast for baking, 144 tons of dehydrated vegetables, 38 tons of salt and 10 tons of cheese. In all, 1,534 tons were required each day to sustain the over two million people of Berlin. Additionally, for heat and power, 3,475 tons of coal, diesel and petrol were also required daily.

Carrying all this in would not be easy. The postwar demobilisation left the US forces in Europe with only two groups of C-47 Skytrain transports (the military version of the Douglas DC-3, which the British called the "Dakota"), nominally 96 aircraft, each of which could carry about 3.5 tons of cargo. LeMay believed that "with an all-out effort" of 100 daily round trips these would be able to haul about 300 tons of supplies a day. The RAF was somewhat better prepared, since it had already moved some aircraft into the German area, and they expected to be able to supply about 400 tons a day.

This was not nearly enough to move the 5,000 tons a day that would be needed, but these numbers could be increased as new aircraft arrived from the United Kingdom, the United States, and France. The RAF would be relied on to increase its numbers quickly. It could fly additional aircraft in from Britain in a single hop, bringing the RAF fleet to about 150 Dakotas and 40 of the larger Avro Yorks with a 10-ton payload.

With this fleet, the British contribution was expected to rise to 750 tons a day in the short term, albeit at the cost of suspending all air traffic except for the airlift to Berlin. For a longer-term operation, the US would have to add additional aircraft as soon as possible, and those would have to be as large as possible while still able to fly into the Berlin airports. Only one aircraft type was suitable, the four-engined C-54 Skymaster and its US Navy equivalent, the R5D, of which the US military had approximately 565, with 268 Air Force and Navy Skymasters in MATS, 168 in the troop carrier groups, and 80 Navy R5Ds in miscellaneous commands. Planners calculated that including C-54s already ordered to Germany and drawing on those flying with civilian carriers, 447 Skymasters could be available for an "extreme emergency".

Given the feasibility assessment made by the British, an airlift appeared to be the best course of action. One remaining concern was the population of Berlin. Clay called in Ernst Reuter, the mayor-elect of Berlin, accompanied by his aide, Willy Brandt. Clay told Reuter:

Reuter, although skeptical, assured Clay that Berlin would make all the necessary sacrifices and that the Berliners would support his actions.

General Albert Wedemeyer, the US Army Chief of Plans and Operations, was in Europe on an inspection tour when the crisis broke out. He had been the commander of the US China Burma India Theater in 1944–45 and he had a detailed knowledge of the previously largest airlift—the World War II American airlift from India over the Hump of the Himalayas to China. His endorsement of the airlift option gave it a major boost. The British and Americans agreed to start a joint operation without delay; the US action was dubbed "Operation Vittles", while the British action was called "Operation Plainfare". The Australian contribution to the airlift, begun in September 1948, was designated "Operation Pelican".

The British asked Canada to contribute planes and crews. It refused, primarily on the grounds that the operation risked war and Canada had not been consulted.

Airlift begins

On 24 June 1948 LeMay appointed Brigadier General Joseph Smith, headquarters commandant for USAFE at Camp Lindsey, as the Provisional Task Force Commander of the airlift. Smith had been chief of staff in LeMay's B-29 command in India during World War II and had no airlift experience.  On 25 June 1948 Clay gave the order to launch Operation Vittles. The next day 32 C-47s lifted off for Berlin hauling 80 tons of cargo, including milk, flour, and medicine. The first British aircraft flew on 28 June. At that time, the airlift was expected to last three weeks. 

On 27 June, Clay cabled William Draper with an estimate of the current situation:

By 1 July, the system was getting under way. C-54s were starting to arrive in quantity, and Rhein-Main Air Base became exclusively a C-54 hub, while Wiesbaden retained a mix of C-54s and C-47s. Aircraft flew northeast through the American air corridor into Tempelhof Airport, then returned due west flying out on through the British air corridor. After reaching the British Zone, they turned south to return to their bases. 

The British ran a similar system, flying southeast from several airports in the Hamburg area through their second corridor into RAF Gatow in the British Sector, and then also returning out on the center corridor, turning for home or landing at Hanover. However, unlike the Americans, the British also ran some round-trips, using their southeast corridor. To save time many flights didn't land in Berlin, instead air dropping material, such as coal, into the airfields. On 6 July the Yorks and Dakotas were joined by Short Sunderland flying boats. Flying from Finkenwerder on the Elbe near Hamburg to the Havel river next to Gatow, their corrosion-resistant hulls suited them to the particular task of delivering baking powder and other salt into the city. The Royal Australian Air Force also contributed to the British effort.

Accommodating the large number of flights to Berlin of dissimilar aircraft with widely varying flight characteristics required close co-ordination. Smith and his staff developed a complex timetable for flights called the "block system": three eight-hour shifts of a C-54 section to Berlin followed by a C-47 section. Aircraft were scheduled to take off every four minutes, flying  higher than the flight in front. This system of stacked inbound serials was later dubbed "the ladder".

During the first week the airlift averaged only ninety tons a day, but by the second week it reached 1,000 tons. This likely would have sufficed had the effort lasted only a few weeks, as originally believed. The Communist press in East Berlin ridiculed the project. It derisively referred to "the futile attempts of the Americans to save face and to maintain their untenable position in Berlin."

Despite the excitement engendered by glamorous publicity extolling the work (and over-work) of the crews and the daily increase of tonnage levels, the airlift was not close to being operated to its capability because USAFE was a tactical organisation without any airlift expertise. Maintenance was barely adequate, crews were not being efficiently used, transports stood idle and disused, necessary record-keeping was scant, and ad hoc flight crews of publicity-seeking desk personnel were disrupting a business-like atmosphere. This was recognised by the United States National Security Council at a meeting with Clay on 22 July 1948, when it became clear that a long-term airlift was necessary. Wedemeyer immediately recommended that the deputy commander for operations of the Military Air Transport Service (MATS), Maj. Gen. William H. Tunner, command the operation. When Wedemeyer had been the commander of US forces in China during World War II, Tunner, as commander of the India-China Division of the Air Transport Command, had reorganised the Hump airlift between India and China, doubling the tonnage and hours flown. USAF Chief of Staff Hoyt S. Vandenberg endorsed the recommendation.

Black Friday
On 28 July 1948, Tunner arrived in Wiesbaden to take over the operation. He revamped the entire airlift operation, reaching an agreement with LeMay to form the Combined Air Lift Task Force (CALTF) to control both the USAFE and RAF lift operations from a central location, which went into effect in mid-October 1948. MATS immediately deployed eight squadrons of C-54s—72 aircraft—to Wiesbaden and Rhein-Main Air Base to reinforce the 54 already in operation, the first by 30 July and the remainder by mid-August, and two-thirds of all C-54 aircrew worldwide began transferring to Germany to allot three crews per aircraft.

Two weeks after his arrival, on 13 August, Tunner decided to fly to Berlin to grant an award to Lt. Paul O. Lykins, an airlift pilot who had made the most flights into Berlin up to that time, a symbol of the entire effort to date. Cloud cover over Berlin dropped to the height of the buildings, and heavy rain showers made radar visibility poor. A C-54 crashed and burned at the end of the runway, and a second one landing behind it burst its tires while trying to avoid it. A third transport ground looped after mistakenly landing on a runway under construction. Newly unloaded planes were denied permission to take off to avoid that possibility and created a backup on the ground. While no one was killed, Tunner was embarrassed that the control tower at Tempelhof had lost control of the situation while the commander of the airlift was circling overhead. Tunner radioed for all stacked aircraft except his to be sent home immediately. This became known as "Black Friday", and Tunner personally noted it was from that date onward that the success of the airlift stemmed.

As a result of Black Friday, Tunner instituted a number of new rules; instrument flight rules (IFR) would be in effect at all times, regardless of actual visibility, and each sortie would have only one chance to land in Berlin, returning to its air base if it missed its approach, where it was slotted back into the flow. Stacking was completely eliminated. With straight-in approaches, the planners found that in the time it had taken to unstack and land nine aircraft, 30 aircraft could be landed, bringing in 300 tons. Accident rates and delays dropped immediately. Tunner decided, as he had done during the Hump operation, to replace the C-47s in the airlift with C-54s or larger aircraft when it was realised that it took just as long to unload a 3.5-ton C-47 as a 10-ton C-54. One of the reasons for this was the sloping cargo floor of the "taildragger" C-47s, which made truck loading difficult. The tricycle geared C-54's cargo deck was level, so that a truck could back up to it and offload cargo quickly. The change went into full effect after 28 September 1948.

Having noticed on his first inspection trip to Berlin on 31 July that there were long delays as the flight crews returned to their aircraft after getting refreshments from the terminal, Tunner banned aircrew from leaving their aircraft for any reason while in Berlin. Instead, he equipped jeeps as mobile snack bars, handing out refreshments to the crews at their aircraft while it was being unloaded. Airlift pilot Gail Halvorsen later noted, "he put some beautiful German Fräuleins in that snack bar. They knew we couldn't date them, we had no time. So they were very friendly." Operations officers handed pilots their clearance slips and other information while they ate. With unloading beginning as soon as engines were shut down on the ramp, turnaround before takeoff back to Rhein-Main or Wiesbaden was reduced to thirty minutes.

Maintenance, particularly adherence to 25-hour, 200-hour, and 1,000-hour inspections, became the highest priority and further maximised utilisation. Tunner also shortened block times to six hours to squeeze in another shift, making 1,440 (the number of minutes in a day) landings in Berlin a daily goal. His purpose, illustrating his basic philosophy of the airlift business, was to create a "conveyor belt" approach to scheduling that could be sped up or slowed down as situations might dictate. The most effective measure taken by Tunner, and the most initially resisted until it demonstrated its efficiency, was creation of a single control point in the CALTF for controlling all air movements into Berlin, rather than each air force doing its own.

The Berliners themselves solved the problem of the lack of manpower. Crews unloading and making airfield repairs at the Berlin airports were made up almost entirely of local civilians, who were given additional rations in return. As the crews increased in experience, the times for unloading continued to fall, with a record set for the unloading of an entire 10-ton shipment of coal from a C-54 in ten minutes, later beaten when a twelve-man crew unloaded the same quantity in five minutes and 45 seconds.

By the end of August 1948, after two months, the Airlift was succeeding; daily operations flew more than 1,500 flights a day and delivered more than 4,500 tons of cargo, enough to keep West Berlin supplied. From January 1949 onwards, 225 C-54s (40% of USAF and USN Skymasters worldwide) were devoted to the lift. Supplies improved to 5,000 tons a day.

"Operation Little Vittles"

Gail Halvorsen, one of the many Airlift pilots, decided to use his off-time to fly into Berlin and make movies with his hand-held camera. He arrived at Tempelhof on 17 July 1948 on one of the C-54s and walked over to a crowd of children who had gathered at the end of the runway to watch the aircraft. He introduced himself and they started to ask him questions about the aircraft and their flights. As a goodwill gesture, he handed out his only two sticks of Wrigley's Doublemint Gum. The children quickly divided up the pieces as best they could, even passing around the wrapper for others to smell. He was so impressed by their gratitude and that they didn't fight over them, that he promised the next time he returned he would drop off more. Before he left them, a child asked him how they would know it was him flying over. He replied, "I'll wiggle my wings."

The next day on his approach to Berlin, he rocked the aircraft and dropped some chocolate bars attached to a handkerchief parachute to the children waiting below. Every day after that, the number of children increased and he made several more drops. Soon, there was a stack of mail in Base Ops addressed to "Uncle Wiggly Wings", "The Chocolate Uncle" and "The Chocolate Flier". His commanding officer was upset when the story appeared in the news, but when Tunner heard about it, he approved of the gesture and immediately expanded it into "Operation Little Vittles". Other pilots participated, and when news reached the US, children all over the country sent in their own candy to help out. Soon, major candy manufacturers joined in. In the end, over three tons of candy were dropped on Berlin and the "operation" became a major propaganda success. German children christened the candy-dropping aircraft "raisin bombers" or candy bombers.

Soviet responses
The Soviets had an advantage in conventional military forces, but were preoccupied with rebuilding their war-torn economy and society. The US had a stronger navy and air force, and had nuclear weapons. Neither side wanted a war; the Soviets did not disrupt the airlift.

Initial reaction
As the tempo of the airlift grew, it became apparent that the Western powers might be able to pull off the impossible: indefinitely supplying an entire city by air alone. In response, starting on 1 August 1948, the Soviets offered free food to anyone who crossed into East Berlin and registered their ration cards there, and almost 22 thousand Berliners received their cards until 4 August 1948. In 1949 more than 100 thousand West Berliners were receiving Soviet supplies in Eastern Berlin. Some West Berliners rejected Soviet offers of food.

Throughout the airlift, Soviet and German communists subjected the hard-pressed West Berliners to sustained psychological warfare. In radio broadcasts, they relentlessly proclaimed that all Berlin came under Soviet authority and predicted the imminent abandonment of the city by the Western occupying powers. The Soviets also harassed members of the democratically elected citywide administration, which had to conduct its business in the city hall located in the Soviet sector.

During the early months of the airlift, the Soviets used various methods to harass allied aircraft. These included buzzing by Soviet planes, obstructive parachute jumps within the corridors, and shining searchlights to dazzle pilots at night. Although the USAFE reported 733 separate harassing events, including flak, air-to-air fire, rocketing, bombing, and explosions, this is now considered to be exaggerated. None of these measures were effective. Former RAF Dakota pilot Dick Arscott described one "buzzing" incident. "Yaks (Soviet fighter aircraft) used to come and buzz you and go over the top of you at about twenty feet which can be off-putting. One day I was buzzed about three times. The following day it started again and he came across twice and I got a bit fed up with it. So when he came for the third time, I turned the aircraft into him and it was a case of chicken, luckily he was the one who chickened out."

Attempted Communist putsch in the municipal government
In the autumn of 1948 it became impossible for the non-Communist majority in Greater Berlin's citywide parliament to attend sessions at city hall within the Soviet sector. The parliament had been elected under the provisional constitution of Berlin two years earlier (20 October 1946). As SED-controlled policemen looked on passively, Communist-led mobs repeatedly invaded the Neues Stadthaus, the provisional city hall (located on Parochialstraße since all other central municipal buildings had been destroyed in the War), interrupted the parliament's sessions, and menaced its non-Communist members. The Kremlin organised an attempted putsch for control of all of Berlin through a 6 September takeover of the city hall by SED members.

Three days later RIAS Radio urged Berliners to protest against the actions of the communists. On 9 September 1948 a crowd of 500,000 people gathered at the Brandenburg Gate, next to the ruined Reichstag in the British sector. The airlift was working so far, but many West Berliners feared that the Allies would eventually discontinue it. Then-SPD city councillor Ernst Reuter took the microphone and pleaded for his city, "You peoples of the world, you people of America, of England, of France, look on this city, and recognise that this city, this people, must not be abandoned—cannot be abandoned!"

The crowd surged towards the Soviet-occupied sector and someone climbed up and ripped down the Soviet flag flying from atop the Brandenburg Gate. Soviet military police (MPs) quickly responded, resulting in the killing of one in the unruly crowd. The tense situation could have escalated further and ended up in more bloodshed but a British deputy provost then intervened and pointedly pushed the Soviet MPs back with his swagger stick. Never before this incident had so many Berliners gathered in unity. The resonance worldwide was enormous, notably in the United States, where a strong feeling of solidarity with Berliners reinforced a general widespread determination not to abandon them.

Berlin's parliament decided to meet instead in the canteen of the Technical College of Berlin-Charlottenburg in the British sector, boycotted by the members of SED, which had gained 19.8% of the electoral votes in 1946. On 30 November 1948 the SED gathered its elected parliament members and 1,100 further activists and held an unconstitutional so-called "extraordinary city assembly" in East Berlin's Metropol-Theater which declared the elected city government and its democratically elected city councillors to be deposed and replaced it with a new one led by Oberbürgermeister Friedrich Ebert Jr. and consisting only of Communists. This arbitrary act had no legal effect in West Berlin, but the Soviet occupants prevented the elected city government for all of Berlin from further acting in the eastern sector.

December elections
The SED did not nominate any candidates for this election and appealed to the electorate in the western sectors to boycott the election, while the democratic parties ran for seats. The turnout amounted to 86.3% of the western electorate with the SPD gaining 64.5% of the votes (= 76 seats), the CDU 19.4% (= 26 seats), and the Liberal-Demokratische Partei (LDP, merged in the FDP in 1949) 16.1% (= 17 seats).

On 7 December the new, de facto West-Berlin-only city parliament elected a new city government in West Berlin headed by Lord Mayor Reuter, who had already once been elected lord mayor in early 1946 but prevented from taking office by a Soviet veto. Thus two separate city governments officiated in the city divided into East and West versions of its former self. In the east, a communist system supervised by house, street, and block wardens was quickly implemented.

Winter 1948 to spring 1949

Preparing for winter
Although the early estimates were that about 4,000 to 5,000 tons per day would be needed to supply the city, this was made in the context of summer weather, when the Airlift was only expected to last a few weeks. As the operation dragged on into autumn, the situation changed considerably. The food requirements would remain the same (around 1,500 tons), but the need for additional coal to heat the city dramatically increased the total amount of cargo to be transported by an additional 6,000 tons a day.

To maintain the Airlift under these conditions, the current system would have to be greatly expanded. Aircraft were available, and the British started adding their larger Handley Page Hastings in November, but maintaining the fleet proved to be a serious problem. Tunner looked to the Germans once again, hiring (plentiful) ex-Luftwaffe ground crews.

Another problem was the lack of runways in Berlin to land on: two at Tempelhof and one at Gatow—neither of which was designed to support the loads the C-54s were putting on them. All of the existing runways required hundreds of labourers, who ran onto them between landings and dumped sand into the runway's Marston Mat (pierced steel planking) to soften the surface and help the planking survive. Since this system could not endure through the winter, between July and September 1948 a 6,000 ft.-long asphalt runway was constructed at Tempelhof.

Far from ideal, with the approach being over Berlin's apartment blocks, the runway nevertheless was a major upgrade to the airport's capabilities. With it in place, the auxiliary runway was upgraded from Marston Matting to asphalt between September and October 1948. A similar upgrade program was carried out by the British at Gatow during the same period, also adding a second runway, using concrete.

The French Air Force, meanwhile, had become involved in the First Indochina War, so it could only bring up a few French built Junkers Ju 52s (known as A.A.C. 1 Toucan) to support its own troops, and they were too small and slow to be of much help. However, France agreed to build a complete, new and larger airport in its sector on the shores of Lake Tegel. French military engineers, managing German construction crews, were able to complete the construction in under 90 days. Because of a shortage of heavy equipment, the first runway was mostly built by hand, by thousands of labourers who worked day and night.

For the second runway at Tegel, heavy equipment was needed to level the ground, equipment that was too large and heavy to fly in on any existing cargo aircraft. The solution was to dismantle large machines and then re-assemble them. Using the five largest American C-82 Packet transports, it was possible to fly the machinery into West Berlin. This not only helped to build the airfield, but also demonstrated that the Soviet blockade could not keep anything out of Berlin. The Tegel airfield was subsequently developed into Berlin Tegel Airport.

To improve air traffic control, which would be critical as the number of flights grew, the newly developed ground-controlled approach radar system (GCA) was flown to Europe for installation at Tempelhof, with a second set installed at Fassberg in the British Zone in West Germany. With the installation of GCA, all-weather airlift operations were assured.
November and December 1948 proved to be the worst months of the airlift operation for the Western Allies. One of the longest-lasting fogs ever experienced in Berlin blanketed the entire European continent for weeks. All too often, aircraft would make the entire flight and then be unable to land in Berlin. On 20 November 1948, 42 aircraft departed for Berlin, but only one landed there. At one point, the city had only a week's supply of coal left. However, the weather eventually improved, and more than 171,000 tons were delivered in January 1949, 152,000 tons in February, and 196,223 tons in March.

Easter parade
By April 1949, airlift operations were running smoothly and Tunner wanted to shake up his command to discourage complacency. He believed in the spirit of competition between units and, coupled with the idea of a big event, felt that this would encourage them to greater efforts. He decided that, on Easter Sunday, the airlift would break all records. To do this, maximum efficiency was needed and so, to simplify cargo-handling, only coal would be airlifted. Coal stockpiles were built up for the effort and maintenance schedules were altered so that the maximum number of aircraft were available.

From noon on 15 April to noon on 16 April 1949, crews worked around the clock. When it was over, 12,941 tons of coal had been delivered in 1,383 flights, without a single accident. A welcome side effect of the effort was that operations in general were boosted, and tonnage increased from 6,729 tons to 8,893 tons per day thereafter. In total, the airlift delivered 234,476 tons in April.

On 21 April, the tonnage of supplies flown into the city exceeded that previously brought by rail.

End of the blockade

On 15 April 1949, the Soviet news agency TASS reported a willingness by the Soviets to lift the blockade. The next day, the US State Department stated that the "way appears clear" for the blockade to end. Soon afterwards, the four powers began serious negotiations, and a settlement was reached on Western terms. On 4 May 1949, the Allies announced an agreement to end the blockade in eight days.

The Soviet blockade of Berlin was lifted at one minute after midnight on 12 May 1949. A British convoy immediately drove through to Berlin, and the first train from West Germany reached Berlin at 5:32 a.m. Later that day, an enormous crowd celebrated the end of the blockade. General Clay, whose retirement had been announced by US President Truman on 3 May 1949, was saluted by 11,000 US soldiers and dozens of aircraft. Once home, Clay received a ticker tape parade in New York City, was invited to address the US Congress, and was honoured with a medal from President Truman.

Nevertheless, supply flights to Berlin continued for some time to build up a comfortable surplus, though night flying and then weekend flights could be eliminated once the surplus was large enough. By 24 July 1949, three months' worth of supplies had been amassed, ensuring that there was ample time to restart the Airlift if needed.

On 18 August 1949, Flt Lt Roy Mather DFC AFC and his crew of Flt Lt Roy Lewis Stewart Hathaway AFC, Flt Lt Richardson and Royston William Marshall AFM of 206 squadron, flew back to Wunstorf for the 404th time during the blockade, the record number of flights for any pilot of any nationality, either civilian or military.

The Berlin Airlift officially ended on 30 September 1949, after fifteen months. In total, the USAF delivered 1,783,573 tons and the RAF 541,937 tons, totalling 2,326,406 tons, nearly two-thirds of which was coal, on 278,228 flights to Berlin. The Royal Australian Air Force delivered 7,968 tons of freight and 6,964 passengers during 2,062 sorties. At the height of the Airlift, one plane reached West Berlin every thirty seconds.

Pilots came from the United States, United Kingdom, Australia, Canada, New Zealand, and South Africa.

A total of 101 fatalities were recorded as a result of the operation, including 40 Britons and 31 Americans, mostly due to non-flying accidents. One Royal Australian Air Force member was killed in an aircraft crash at Lübeck while attached to No. 27 Squadron RAF. Seventeen American and eight British aircraft crashed during the operation.

The cost of the Airlift was shared between the US, UK, and German authorities in the Western sectors of occupation. Estimated costs range from approximately US$224 million to over US$500 million (equivalent to approximately $ to $ now).

Subsequent events

Operational control of the three Allied air corridors was assigned to BARTCC (Berlin Air Route Traffic Control Center) air traffic control located at Tempelhof. Diplomatic approval was granted by a four-power organisation called the Berlin Air Safety Center, also located in the American sector.

Berlin crises 1946–1962 

Millions of East Germans escaped to West Germany from East Germany, and Berlin became a major escape route.  This led to major-power conflict over Berlin that stretched at least from 1946 to the construction of the Berlin Wall in 1961. Dwight D. Eisenhower became US President in 1953 and Nikita Khrushchev became Soviet leader in the same year. Khrushchev tried to push Eisenhower on Berlin in 1958–59. The Soviets backed down when Eisenhower's resolve seemed to match that of Truman.  When Eisenhower was replaced by Kennedy in 1961, Khrushchev tried again, with essentially the same result.

Other developments 

In the late 1950s, the runways at West Berlin's city centre Tempelhof Airport had become too short to accommodate the new-generation jet aircraft, and Tegel was developed into West Berlin's principal airport.  During the 1970s and 1980s Schönefeld had its own crossing points through the Berlin Wall and communist fortifications for western citizens.

The Soviets' contravention by the blockade of the agreement reached by the London 6-Power Conference, and the Czechoslovak coup d'état of 1948, convinced Western leaders that they had to take swift and decisive measures to strengthen the portions of Germany not occupied by the Soviets.

The US, British and French authorities also agreed to replace their military administrations in their occupation zones with High Commissioners operating within the terms of a three-power occupation statute. The Blockade also helped to unify German politicians in these zones in support of the creation of a West German state; some of them had hitherto been fearful of Soviet opposition. The blockade also increased the perception among many Europeans that the Soviets posed a danger, helping to prompt the entry into NATO of Portugal, Iceland, Italy, Denmark, and Norway.

It has been claimed that animosities between Germans and the Western Allies were greatly reduced by the airlift, with the former enemies recognising common interests. The Soviets refused to return to the Allied Control Council in Berlin, rendering the four-power occupation authority set up at the Potsdam Conference useless. It has been argued that the events of the Berlin Blockade are proof that the Allies conducted their affairs within a rational framework, since they were keen to avoid war.

Post-Cold War 

In 2007, Tegel was joined by a re-developed Berlin-Schönefeld International Airport in Brandenburg. As a result of the development of these two airports, Tempelhof was closed in October 2008, while Gatow became home of the Bundeswehr Museum of Military History – Berlin-Gatow Airfield and a housing development. In October 2020, the expansion of Schönefeld into the larger Berlin Brandenburg Airport was completed, making Tegel mostly redundant as well.

Aircraft used in the Berlin Airlift

United States
 Boeing C-97 Stratofreighter
 Consolidated B-24 Liberator
 Consolidated PBY Catalina
 Douglas C-54 Skymaster and Douglas DC-4
 Douglas C-74 Globemaster
 Douglas C-47 Skytrain and Douglas DC-3
 Fairchild C-82 Packet
 Lockheed C-121A Constellation

In the early days, the Americans used their C-47 Skytrain or its civilian counterpart Douglas DC-3. These machines could carry a payload of up to 3.5 tons, but were replaced by C-54 Skymasters and Douglas DC-4s, which could carry up to 10 tons and were faster. These made up a total of 330 aircraft, which made them the most used types. Other American aircraft such as the five C-82 Packets, and the one YC-97A Stratofreighter , with a payload of 20 tons—a gigantic load for that time—were only sparsely used.

British
 Avro Lancaster
 Avro Lincoln
 Avro York
 Avro Tudor
 Avro Lancastrian
 Bristol Type 170 Freighter
 Douglas DC-3 (Dakota)
 Handley Page Hastings
 Handley Page Halifax Halton
 Short Sunderland
 Vickers VC.1 Viking

The British used a considerable variety of aircraft types. Many aircraft were either former bombers or civil versions of bombers. In the absence of enough transports, the British chartered many civilian aircraft. British European Airways (BEA) coordinated all British civil aircraft operations. Apart from BEA itself, the participating airlines included British Overseas Airways Corporation (BOAC) and most British independent airlines of that era—e.g. Eagle Aviation, Silver City Airways, British South American Airways (BSAA), the Lancashire Aircraft Corporation, Airwork, Air Flight, Aquila Airways, Flight Refuelling Ltd (which used their Lancaster tankers to deliver aviation fuel), Skyways, Scottish Airlines and Ciro's Aviation.

Altogether, BEA was responsible to the RAF for the direction and operation of 25 British airlines taking part in "Operation Plainfare". The British also used flying boats, particularly for transporting corrosive salt. These included civilian aircraft operated by Aquila Airways. These took off and landed on water and were designed to be corrosion-resistant. In winter, when ice covered the Berlin rivers and made the use of flying boats difficult, the British used other aircraft in their place.

Altogether, a total of 692 aircraft were engaged in the Berlin Airlift, more than 100 of which belonged to civilian operators.

Other aircraft included Junkers Ju 52/3m which were operated briefly by France.

See also
 Armageddon: A Novel of Berlin, 1963 novel by Leon Uris chronicling the airlift
 Berlin Airlift Device for the Army of Occupation and Navy Occupation Service Medals
 The Big Lift, a 1950 film about the experiences of some Americans during the airlift
 Deutsche Mark § Currency reform of June 1948
 East German mark § Currency reform
 Medal for Humane Action, American medal for the Airlift
 Heinrich Rau § 1945–1949, chairman of the East German administration at the time

Footnotes

Notes

Citations

References

 
 
 
 
 
 Harrington, Daniel F. Berlin on the Brink: The Blockade, the Airlift, and the Early Cold War (2012), University of Kentucky Press, Lexington, KY, .
 Larson, Deborah Welch. "The Origins of Commitment: Truman and West Berlin," Journal of Cold War Studies, 13#1 Winter 2011, pp. 180–212
 
 
 
 Schrader, Helena P. The Blockade Breakers: The Berlin Airlift (2011)

Further reading 
 Daum, Andreas W. "America's Berlin, 1945‒2000: Between Myths and Visions". In Frank Trommler (ed.), Berlin: The New Capital in the East. The American Institute for Contemporary German Studies, Johns Hopkins University, 2000, pp. 49–73 online
 , in German
 Fenton Jr, Robert. "The Berlin Airlift and the Use of Air Mobility as a Function of U.S. Policy." (Air War College, Air University Maxwell AFB, 2016) online.
 Grehan, John. The Berlin Airlift: The World's Largest Ever Air Supply Operation (Pen and Sword, 2019).
 
 
 O'Connell, Kaete M. "'Uncle Wiggly Wings': Children, chocolates, and the Berlin Airlift." Food and Foodways 25.2 (2017): 142–159.
 Turner, Barry. The Berlin Airlift: The Relief Operation that Defined the Cold War (Icon Books, 2017).
 Windsor, Philip. "The Berlin Crises" History Today (June 1962) Vol. 6, pp. 375–384, summarizes the series of crises 1946 to 1961; online.

External links

  – A PBS site on the context and history of the Berlin Airlift.
 Operation Plainfare
 The Berlin Airlift Historical Foundation's Website
 Luftbruecke: Allied Culture in the Heart of Berlin
 Agreement to divide Berlin
 Memorandum for the President: The Situation in Germany, 23 July 1948 
 Berlin Airlift: Logistics, Humanitarian Aid, and Strategic Success
 Royal Engineers Museum Royal Engineers and the Cold War (Berlin Airlift)
 Berlin Airlift US Department of Defense
  – A 1948 film about the airlift, told from the British point of view.
 The Berlin Airlift
 
 

 
Non-combat military operations involving the United States
Non-combat military operations involving the United Kingdom
Non-combat military operations involving Australia
20th-century history of the Royal Air Force
Cold War conflicts
1948 in military history
1949 in military history
Diplomatic incidents
Allied occupation of Germany
1948 in Germany
1949 in Germany
Germany–Soviet Union relations
Soviet Union–United Kingdom relations
Soviet Union–United States relations
Foreign relations of the Soviet Union
Berlin
Eastern Bloc
1949 in international relations
1948 in international relations
Airbridge (logistics)
Airlifts
Combat incidents
Cold War history of Germany
Articles containing video clips
1940s in Berlin
20th-century history of the United States Air Force
Germany–United Kingdom military relations
Germany–United States military relations